Rodney Terence Argent (born 14 June 1945) is an English musician. In a career spanning more than 50 years, Argent came to prominence in the mid-1960s as the keyboardist, founder and leader of the rock band the Zombies, and went on to form the band Argent after the first break-up of the Zombies.

Argent is one of the main composers of the Zombies' music and made major lyrical contributions to the band's songs. As the band's keyboardist he used a variety of instruments, including Hohner Pianet, Mellotron, harpsichord, and organ.

In addition to his work with the Zombies and Argent, Argent has made music for television series, been a session musician, produced albums by other artists, and had a solo career which has included three studio albums: Moving Home, Red House, and Classically Speaking. Argent was inducted into the Rock and Roll Hall of Fame as a member of the Zombies in Brooklyn in March 2019.

Early years
Argent was born in St Albans, Hertfordshire, into a working-class family. His father, Les Argent, was an aeronautical engineer who machined parts at the De Havilland aircraft factory; he had also been the leader of two semi-professional dance bands, the Les Argent Quartet and Les Argent and his Rhythm Kings. Although his father did not teach Argent music, he was raised hearing him playing the upright piano in the family home. Argent's mother was one of eight children, and Argent grew up with "a substantial network of cousins, uncles and aunts" living in the town.

He decided to become a musician "aged eight or nine", and as a child, he sang as a chorister in the St Albans Cathedral Choir. While at St Albans School, he met Paul Atkinson and Hugh Grundy. Argent, Atkinson, and Grundy first played together at a jam on Easter 1961 in St Albans.

Argent wanted to form a band and initially asked his cousin Jim Rodford to join as a bass guitarist. Rodford was playing in local band called the Bluetones at the time, so declined. Colin Blunstone and Paul Arnold joined the new band in early 1961, while all five members were still at school. Arnold left not long after and was replaced by Chris White. After the band won a local contest, they recorded a demo as their prize. Argent's song "She's Not There" got them a recording contract with Decca.

Career

The Zombies
In addition to playing the piano and keyboards in the Zombies, Argent was (with White) one of the group's two main songwriters, penning the hits "She's Not There", "Tell Her No", and "Time of the Season", amongst others. Argent was initially the group's lead singer, with Blunstone on guitar. When Argent's keyboard talents became apparent, he became the group's full-time keyboard player, conceding the role of lead singer to Blunstone. The group continued to record through the 1960s, but disbanded in December 1967, reportedly over management disagreements.

Argent
After the band broke up, Argent went on to form the band Argent, which had a hit album in 1972 with All Together Now, which contained the single "Hold Your Head Up". His Hammond B3 solo on that track is cited by Rick Wakeman as the greatest organ solo ever. The band also recorded the original version of the rock anthem "God Gave Rock and Roll to You", written by lead singer Russ Ballard, which was later covered by other artists including Petra and Kiss. Argent's first album included the song "Liar" (also composed by Ballard), which became a hit for Three Dog Night. In 1976, the band broke up.

Solo career
In 1978, Argent released his debut solo album Moving Home with many well-known musicians, including Gary Moore, Genesis drummer Phil Collins, and Weather Report bass guitarist Alphonso Johnson. In 1980, he wrote a  musical titled Masquerade which premiered in London in 1982. In 1988, he issued another solo album, Red House.

Argent went on to play keyboards with a number of musicians, including piano on the title track of The Who's album Who Are You, and on Variations with Gary Moore, Julian Lloyd Webber, and Andrew Lloyd Webber. In the 1980s he began writing for television. In 1986, he composed the theme music for ITV's coverage of the 1986 FIFA World Cup, Aztec Gold, which he released as a single under the name of Silsoe. Also in 1986, he composed the theme music for ITV's The Two of Us and for 1987's LWT series Bust. Two years later, the Argent/Van Hooke composition "Goal Crazy" was used by ITV's The Match from 1988 until 1992; and the duo also composed the now-familiar theme music for ITV's It'll Be Alright On The Night, first used in series 6 in 1990 and then until 2008.  Argent also composed the theme music to the ITV (LWT) sitcom The Piglet Files, which aired from 1990 to 1992.

In 1987, Argent formed a production company with ex-Van Morrison drummer Peter Van Hooke which produced a number of artists. In 1995, Argent produced Soraya's debut album On Nights Like This and her second album Wall Of Smiles. Other albums the business partners produced included Tanita Tikaram's Ancient Heart (1988), Nanci Griffith's Late Night Grande Hotel (1991), Joshua Kadison's Painted Desert Serenade (1993), and Jules Shear's Healing Bones (1994).

In 1999, Argent recorded a solo piano album, Rod Argent Classically Speaking, in which he played Chopin études and music by Ravel, Bach, and Grieg, as well as three of his own compositions. In 2006, Argent joined Hamish Stuart, Richard Marx, Billy Squier, Edgar Winter and Sheila E. to tour with Ringo Starr & His All-Starr Band.

The Zombies reunion

In 2004, Argent and Colin Blunstone recorded a new album, As Far as I Can See..., in the style of The Zombies. A subsequent album and DVD Colin Blunstone & Rod Argent of the Zombies Live at the Bloomsbury Theatre received favourable reviews, as did their 2007 US tour. One critic noted, "The Zombies, still led by original keyboard wizard Rod Argent and featuring the smoked-silk vocals of Colin Blunstone, is the best 60s band still touring which doesn't have Mick Jagger as a front man".

Argent continued to tour with Colin Blunstone as The Zombies, and in March 2008 the original surviving members of the band played three reunion concerts at the Shepherd’s Bush Empire, performing the album Odessey and Oracle. The band were introduced by Al Kooper, who had discovered the album in a record shop in Carnaby Street in London after the band had broken up. He promoted it on radio stations in the US, leading to "Time of the Season" becoming a Top 3 hit in the singles charts. The sold out concerts (attended by several DJs and musical celebrities) led to a band reunion. In a 2015 interview with PopMatters journalist J.C. Maçek III about the Zombies' latest album Still Got That Hunger, Argent said "Still Got That Hunger is the first album that has really recaptured some of the resonance of feeling of a group. We're so tight as a group together now. And the whole process has become so organic that we're 100% happy with the Zombies name and rediscovering and playing all the old stuff and at the same time carving a new path forward which is also very, very important to us."

In 2012, Argent participated in the unveiling of a Blue Plaque at The Blacksmith's Arms, a pub in St Albans where the Zombies met for their first rehearsal.

Personal life
Argent and his wife Cathy met at a party in 1967, and they married in 1972. They have two children, Elesa and Mark.

Discography
Band albums
 The Zombies – Begin Here (1965)
 The Zombies – Odessey and Oracle (1968)
 The Zombies – R.I.P. (1969)
 Argent – Argent (1970)
 Argent – Ring of Hands (1971)
 Argent – All Together Now (1972)
 Argent – In Deep (1973)
 Argent – Nexus (1974)
 Argent – Encore: Live in Concert (1974)
 Argent – Circus (1975)
 Argent – Counterpoints (1975)
 Shadowshow – Shadowshow (1985)
 Argent – In Concert (1995)
 Argent – The Complete BBC Sessions (1997)
 Argent-Blunstone – Out of the Shadows (2001) – Redhouse REDHCD

 The Zombies – Live at the BBC (2003) (Expanded and re-released as 'The BBC Radio Sessions''' (2016)
 The Zombies – As Far as I Can See… (2004)
 The Zombies – Live at the Bloomsbury Theatre, London (2005)
 The Zombies – On The BBC Radio (2007)
 The Zombies – Odessey and Oracle: 40th Anniversary Live Concert (2008)
 Argent – High Voltage Festival (2010)
 The Zombies – Breathe Out, Breathe In (2011)
 The Zombies – Live In Concert At Metropolis Studios (2012)
 The Zombies – Live in the UK (2013)
 The Zombies – Still Got That Hunger (2015)

Solo albums
 Moving Home (1978)
 Ghosts (1981) (with Barbara Thompson)
 Metro (1983) (with John Dankworth)
 A New Age (1984) (with Robert Howes)
 Second Sight (1984) (with Robert Howes)
 Network Heroes (1987) (with Robert Howes)
 The Advance of Man (1988) (with Robert Howes)
 Red House (1988)
 Rescue (1989) (with Robert Howes)
 Classically Speaking (1998)

Appearances
 Pastourelle (Inspired By The Songs Of The Auvergne) (1982)
 Wild Connections'' (1987)

References

External links
 
 Official website
 Interview with Rod Argent on Pause&Play website – April 2001
 
 
 Rod Argent Interview – The Austin Chronicle – Feb 20 2004
 Rod Argent Interview NAMM Oral History Library (2011)

1945 births
Living people
The Zombies members
Argent (band) members
English rock keyboardists
musicians from St Albans
People educated at St Albans School, Hertfordshire
Musicians from Hertfordshire
English male singer-songwriters
English classical pianists
Male classical pianists
British male pianists
21st-century classical pianists
21st-century British male musicians
Ringo Starr & His All-Starr Band members